Wietze is a municipality in Lower Saxony, Germany.

Wietze may also refer to:
Wietze (Aller), a river of Lower Saxony, Germany, tributary of the Aller
Wietze (Örtze), a river of Lower Saxony, Germany, tributary of the Örtze